Hosdurg Fort is a fort in Kanhangad which is part of Kasaragod district in Kerala state. Hosdurg Fort with its round bastion looks imposing from a distance. Somashekara Nayaka from the Keladi Nayaka dynasty of Ikkeri built this fort. The place is made well known by the Nithyanandasram with 45 caves. The fort is now in ruins, but located nearby is a school and some government offices.

To the south-west of the fort is a temple that was also built by the Nayaks. The temple, dedicated to Shiva, is named the Poonkavanam Karpooreswara Temple.

See also
 Bekal Fort
 Kannur Fort
 Thalassery Fort

Forts in Kerala
Buildings and structures in Kasaragod district